Roma Independent School District is a public school district based in Roma, Texas (USA).  The district currently serves over 6,000 students.

In 2009, the school district was rated "academically acceptable" by the Texas Education Agency.

Catchment area
In addition to the city of Roma, the district serves students residing in Escobares and various census-designated places in western Starr County. CDPs served by Roma include:

 Anacua
 Barrera (portion)
 Benjamin Perez
 Campo Verde
 Casas
 Chapeno
 El Cenizo
 El Quiote
 Evergreen
 Falcon Heights
 Falcon Village 
 Falconaire
 Flor del Rio
 Fronton
 Fronton Ranchettes
 Garceno
 Guadalupe Guerra
 H. Cuellar Estates
 Hilltop
 Indio
 Jardin de San Julian
 JF Villarreal
 La Chuparosa
 La Esperanza
 La Loma de Falcon
 La Minita
 La Rosita
 Lago Vista
 Loma Linda West
 Loma Vista
 Los Alvarez (about half)
 Los Arrieros
 Los Barreras
 Los Ebanos
 Mesquite
 Miguel Barrera
 Moraida
 North Escobares
 Palo Blanco
 Pena
 Ramos
 Rancho Viejo
 Regino Ramirez
 Salineño
 Salineño North
 San Juan
 Sandoval
 Sunset
 Tierra Dorada

Former CDPs:
Los Alvarez (most of the former CDP)
Los Villareales (partial)
Roma Creek - the 2010 version of the CDP is now, as of 2020, entirely in the city of Roma
2000s boundary of Roma Creek

Schools
High school (Grades 9-12)
Roma High School 

Middle schools (Grades 6-8)
Ramiro Barrera Middle School
Roma Middle School

Elementary schools (Grades PK-5)
R.T. Barrera Elementary School
Delia Gonzalez Garcia Elementary School (Formerly Ynes B. Escobar Elementary School)
Roel & Celia Saenz Elementary School
F.J. Scott Elementary School
Emma Vera Elementary School 
Veterans Memorial Elementary School

Other campuses
Instructional and Guidance School (ALAS)

Former schools
Anna S. Canavan Elementary School

References

External links
 

School districts in Starr County, Texas